This is a list of television programs broadcast by the Brazilian cable television channel Multishow.

Current programming

Original programming
220 volts
Adorável Psicose
Amoral da História
Até Que Faz Sentido
Bastidores
Bicicleta e Melancia
BBB: A Eliminação (on hiatus)
Casa Bonita (on hiatus)
Cilada
Conexões Urbanas
De Cabelo em Pé
De Cara Limpa
Desenrola Aí
Dois Elementos
Experimente
Extremos
Fábrica De Estrelas
Geleia do Rock
I Love My Nerd
Intercâmbio
Kaiak
Lu Alone
Lugar Incomum
Mais X Favela
Minha Praia
Morando Sozinho
Muito Giro
Na Fama e Na Lama
Nalu pelo Mundo
Não Conta Lá em Casa
No Caminho
Nós 3
Olívias na TV
Operação S2
Osso Duro
Outros Lugares
Papo Calcinha
Pé no Chão
As Pegadoras
Por Trás da Fama
Qual é a Boa?
Quase Anônimos
Que Rock é Esse?
Reclame
Rock Estrada
Se Joga!
Sensacionalista
TVZ
Clássicos Multishow
Top TVZ
TVneja
TVZ Experimente
Urbano
Vai pra Onde?
Viagem Sem Fim
Ferdinando Show
A Grande Farsa
Tudo Pela Audiência
Ceará Fora Da Casinha
Lugar Incomum
Humor Multishow
O Estranho Show De Renatinho
Sexy Car Wash
30 Antes dos 30
Ai eu vi Vantagem
Papo de Polícia

Non-original programming
100 Coisas Para Fazer Antes de Morrer (The Buried Life)
Altas Horas (repeat of the previous night's episode on Globo)
Big Brother Brasil (extended coverage)
Chapolin (El Chapulín Colorado)
Chaves (El Chavo del Ocho)
The City
O Clube das Bad Girls (The Bad Girls Club)
Cybernet
Degrassi: Nova Geração (Degrassi: The Next Generation)
Desajustados (Misfits)
Dr. Drew: Rehab (Celebrity Rehab with Dr. Drew)
Dr. Drew: Sexo Papai e Mamãe (Sex...with Mom and Dad)
Efeito Ex (The X Effect)
Fight Girls
As Gostosas e os Geeks (Beauty and the Geek)
The Hills
Jackass
Life on Mars
My Big Fat Obnoxious Fiancé
Paris Hilton's British Best Friend
Ser Humano (Being Human)
Sex and the City
Sexcetera
Sexytime
Skins
Sound
Chamado Central
Multishow Music live
Partoba
TVZ Classicos
Treme Treme
E ai Comeu?
Anota Ai
Tá rindo do Quê?

Specials
Multishow Ao Vivo
Multishow Registro
Prêmio Multishow De Humor
Vai Que Cola
Xilindro
Musica Boa
Batalha De Pegadinhas
Quer Dinheiro?
Só Rindo Com Betty White
Ai Eu Vim Vantagem
Foursome
Meu Passado Me Condena
Bagulho Louco com Mr.Catra
Toc`s de Dalila

Past programming
Agente 86 (Get Smart, currently seen on TCM Classic Entertainment)
Balada em Revista
Batom e Parafina
Beijo, me liga!
Born to Be
A Casa Animada (Drawn Together)
Circo do Edgard
Code Monkeys
Dead Set
Diddy Monta Sua Banda (Making His Band)
Edgard no Ar
Fundo do Poço (Rock Bottom)
Havaí 5-0 (Hawaii Five-O, 1968–1980 series)
Inside the Actors Studio (currently seen on Film & Arts)
Instant Star (currently seen on Boomerang)
The Kids in the Hall
Laguna Beach (Laguna Beach: The Real Orange County)
MOB Brasil
Na Trilha Certa (Redemption Song)
Newport Harbor (Newport Harbor: The Real Orange County)
O Mundo Secreto de Alex Mack (The Secret World of Alex Mack)
Quero Ser Um Cineasta
Será que Faz Sentido?
Só Rindo (Just for Laughs)
South Park (currently seen on VH1)
Stargame
Tribos
Vida Loca Show
The Wonder Years

Television networks in Brazil
Globosat
Multishow